Arthur Sylvester may refer to:

 Arthur G. Sylvester, American geologist
 Pen name of Arthur L. Tubbs, writer and critic